The following is a list of awards and nominations received by American writer, director and producer Alexander Payne. Known for the films About Schmidt, Sideways and The Descendants, he has won two Academy Awards, three Golden Globes, a British Academy Film Award and has been nominated for a Grammy.

Organizations

Academy Awards

BAFTA Awards

Golden Globe Awards

Gotham Awards

Grammy Awards

Independent Spirit Awards

Satellite Awards

Guild awards

Directors Guild of America Awards

Producers Guild of America Awards

Writers Guild of America Awards

Other awards

Critics associations

Film festivals

References

External links
 

Lists of awards received by film director
Lists of awards received by writer